Aatamin puvussa ja vähän Eevankin (In Adam's costume and a little in Eve's too) is  a 1931 Finnish comedy film directed and written by Jaakko Korhonen based on the novel of the same name by Yrjö Soini. The film's runtime is 104 minutes. It is the first Finnish film to have sound, although sound is limited to sound effects and some singing. The dialogue is still only displayed in bilingual intertitles.

In 1959 the film was remade in West Germany as Two Times Adam, One Time Eve.

Cast
Joel Rinne as Aarne Himanen
Elsa Segerberg as Alli
Yrjö Tuominen as Paavo Kehkonen
Kaarlo Saarnio as Viirimäki
Uuno Montonen as Kalle Vikström
Heikki Välisalmi as Police chief
Anja Suonio-Similä as Liisa
Olga Leino as  Old woman
Ellen Sylvin as Lehtinen's daughter
Kaija Suonio as  Mrs. Lehtinen
Runar Idefeldt as Constable Lehtinen

See also
Aatamin puvussa ja vähän Eevankin (1940)
Aatamin puvussa ja vähän Eevankin (1971)

Notes

External links
 

1930s Finnish-language films
1931 films
1931 comedy films
Films based on Finnish novels
Finnish comedy films
Finnish black-and-white films
Transitional sound comedy films